Ma Yuanan (born 9 April 1945) is a Chinese former footballer and manager.

Career
Ma played football before retiring in 1975, and began coaching afterwards. He was the head coach of the China women's national team from 1992 until 2001. He led the team at four major international tournaments, the 1995 FIFA Women's World Cup, 1996 Summer Olympics, 1999 FIFA Women's World Cup and 2000 Summer Olympics.

References

External links
 
 
 Ma Yuanan at Soccerdonna.de 

1945 births
Living people
Chinese footballers
Chinese football managers
Women's association football managers
China women's national football team managers
1995 FIFA Women's World Cup managers
1999 FIFA Women's World Cup managers
Association footballers not categorized by position